John Brian Long (born 3 December 1935) is a British computer scientist and Emeritus Professor of Cognitive Engineering at the University College London, known for his work on "cognitive ergonomics and human-computer interaction."

Biography 
Long obtained his BA in Modern Languages from Cambridge University in 1960, his BSc in Psychology from Hull University in 1970, and his PhD in Cognitive Engineering from Cambridge University in 1978 with the thesis, entitled "Multidimensional Signal Recognition: Reduced Efficiency and Process Interaction," under supervision of Donald Broadbent. In 2001 he obtained his D.Eng from the London University.

Long started his academic career as Reader at the University College London in 1979, and was later appointed Professor of Cognitive Ergonomics> He also chaired its Ergonomics and HCI Unit, and was Director of Studies for both their MSc and PhD programs. in 2001 he became Emeritus Professor of Cognitive Engineering. Since 1989 he is Concurrent Professor at the Northeastern Forestry University in Harbin, China, and he has been Visiting Professor at the Swinburne University of Technology in 1997,  Melbourne, at the Eindhoven University of Technology in 1998–2000, and at the Universiti Malaysia Sarawak in 2000.

Long is seen as one of the founders of the field of human-computer interactions in the UK. In 2010 Journal Interacting with Computers published a Special Issue Festschrift for John Long.

Selected publications 
 J. Long, A. Baddeley (Eds.), Attention and performance IX, Proceedings of the Ninth International Symposium on Attention and Performance, Jesus college, Cambridge, England, July 13-18, 1980 Erlbaum, Hillsdale, NJ (1980). 
 Long, John, and Andy Whitefield, eds. Cognitive ergonomics and human-computer interaction. Vol. 1. Cambridge University Press, 1989.
 Lim, Kee Yong, and John B. Long. The MUSE method for usability engineering. Vol. 8. Cambridge University Press, 2009.

Articles, a selection:

References

External links
John Long at UCL

1935 births
Living people
British computer scientists
Alumni of the University of Cambridge
Academics of University College London